Nunzio Rotondo (11 December 1924 – 15 September 2009) was an Italian jazz trumpeter and bandleader, born in Palestrina.

Rotondo began on piano in his youth before taking up trumpet, and had already played with Louis Armstrong on that instrument by the end of the 1940s. Early in the 1950s he played with Flavio Ambrosetti, Bill Coleman, Roy Eldridge, Duke Ellington, Zoot Sims, and Toots Thielemans, and also led his own ensembles which included, among others, Gil Cuppini, Roberto Nicolosi, and Romano Mussolini. In the 1960s, Rotondo did little live performing, but played frequently on radio broadcasts with Gato Barbieri, Franco D'Andrea, Pierre Favre, and Mal Waldron. He continued working with D'Andrea through the early 1970s. He was less active in the 1980s and 1990s.

References
"Nunzio Rotondo". The New Grove Dictionary of Jazz. 2nd edition, ed. Barry Kernfeld.

1924 births
2009 deaths
Italian jazz trumpeters
Male trumpeters
Italian jazz bandleaders
Male jazz musicians
Burials at the Cimitero Flaminio
20th-century Italian male musicians